Northwest High School is a public high school located in far northern Fort Worth, Texas, with a Justin postal address. Located in southwest Denton County and classified as a 5A school by the UIL, it is a part of the Northwest Independent School District. The school is located southwest of Texas State Highway 114 and Farm to Market Road 156, about a mile west of the Texas Motor Speedway, and two miles north of Fort Worth Alliance Airport. In 2013, the school was rated "Academically Acceptable" by the Texas Education Agency.

Students can choose their courses from 60 subjects. Northwest High School offers many Advanced Placement classes. All of the students at the high school have the option to rent a Chromebook for school use as of the 2016–2017 school year. Northwest was named a 2001-02 National Blue Ribbon School.

History
Northwest ISD was created in 1948 when the communities of Haslet, Justin, Rhome, and Roanoke met to consolidate their school districts into one. The community of Fairview was added to the district the next year. Construction began in 1950 on a consolidated high school. In 1988, the current building was constructed and has received several updates since.

Campus
It has a coffeeshop called Java City.

Feeder schools
The middle schools that feed into Northwest High School are: 
Gene Pike Middle School
Chisolm Trail Middle School

Athletics
The Northwest Texans compete in volleyball, cross country, football, basketball, powerlifting, wrestling, swimming, soccer, golf, tennis, track, baseball, softball, drill/dance team, marching band, and cheerleading.

Notable alumni
Tyler Collins – former MLB outfielder 
Mark Followill – sports announcer for the Dallas Mavericks
Dustin May – pitcher for the Los Angeles Dodgers
Laina Morris – internet personality
Jared Retkofsky – former long snapper for the Pittsburgh Steelers
Jordan Wall – played Joe Talbot in the children's public television show Wishbone (1998)

References

External links

Northwest ISD

Public high schools in Fort Worth, Texas
High schools in Denton County, Texas
Northwest Independent School District high schools
Educational institutions established in 1949
1949 establishments in Texas